Loreto Cristina Valenzuela Valdivia (born 3 July 1956) is a Chilean actress and director, recognized for her extensive career in theater and television.

Biography
Loreto Valenzuela studied business engineering at the University of Chile's  from 1972 to 1973 due to political considerations. After the 1973 military coup, a continuous persecution against leftist students began. The school was dissolved the same year, so she was forced to abandon her studies. Subsequently, she took secretarial and acting courses at the School of Communication Arts (EAC) of the Pontifical Catholic University, graduating in 1979.

In 1979 she starred with Luz Jiménez, Myriam Palacios, and Soledad Alonso in the play Tres Marías y una Rosa by David Benavente and directed by Raúl Osorio. Its success led her to tour Latin America and Europe. In the theater, she has excelled in the productions Three Sisters by Chekhov, El día que me quieras by José Ignacio Cabrujas, Invitación a cenar by Egon Wolff, and a theatrical adaptation of Dona Flor and Her Two Husbands by Jorge Amado, in addition to several plays with the outstanding  company, such as Sueños de mala muerte and Oleada.

In the telenovela she played a small but fundamental role, sharing a scene with Malú Gatica, Luz Jiménez, and Alfredo Castro.

In 1986, she obtained her first leading role, in María Elena Gertner's enigmatic La dama del balcón. Valenzuela plays three characters and earned the recognition of TV critics. The character suffers a Nazi genetic experiment that keeps her young. However, the telenovela was censored by the military regime of Augusto Pinochet. Later, she participated in 's successful miniseries La Quintrala (1987), playing Rufina, a sorceress slave. In this production, she shared credits with Raquel Argandoña, and María Izquierdo.

In 2000 she returned to TVN after making special appearances on some shows.

In 2016 she obtained her first antagonistic role in Amanda, playing Catalina Minardi, a rigid and narcissistic matriarch who suffers from a facial paralysis, owner of the estate where the protagonist returns for revenge. The character has been ranked as one of the actress's best performances, both in terms of aesthetics and idioms.

Valenzuela plays an important social role together with the CoArtRe Corporation, which works on the reintegration of Chilean prisoners into the labor market.

Filmography

Film

Telenovelas

TV series and specials

Theater
 
 Three Sisters
 El día en que me quieras
 Invitación a cenar
 Dona Flor and Her Two Husbands
 Debajo de las polleras (2004)
  (2009)
 The House of the Spirits (2010)

Awards and nominations

Caleuche Awards

Copihue de Oro

FOTECH Award

Wikén-GfK Adimark Poll

References

External links
 

1956 births
20th-century Chilean actresses
21st-century Chilean actresses
Chilean film actresses
Chilean stage actresses
Chilean telenovela actresses
Living people
People from San Antonio, Chile
Pontifical Catholic University of Chile alumni